Kreis Obornik was a district in Regierungsbezirk Posen in the Prussian province of Posen until 1919. Its territory presently lies in the north-western part of Polish region of Greater Poland Voivodeship.

Demographics

Civil registry offices 
In 1905, these civil registry offices served the following town in Kreis Obornik:  
 Obornik

References

Districts of the Province of Posen